The 1913 Clemson Tigers football team represented Clemson Agricultural College—now known as Clemson University during the 1913 Southern Intercollegiate Athletic Association football season. Led by Bob Williams, who returned for his third season as head coach after having helmed the team in 1906 and 1909, the Tigers compiled an overall record of 4–4 with a mark of 2–4 in SIAA play. A. P. Gandy was the team captain.

Schedule

References

Bibliography
 

Clemson
Clemson Tigers football seasons
Clemson Tigers football